Jean-Claude Fasquelle (29 November 1930 – 13 March 2021) was a French publisher.

Biography
Jean-Claude Fasquelle graduated with a law degree.

In 1954, he began directing Éditions Fasquelle. The publisher merged with Éditions Grasset in 1959 and he subsequently became director general. He became CEO of the company in 1981 after the retirement of Bernard Privat and became chairman of its supervisory board in 2000. He was succeeded by Olivier Nora. During his time at Grasset, he founded the Libelles collection, which featured authors such as Jacques Audiberti, Jean Cau, Bernard Frank, François Nourissier, Roger Vailland, and others. He oversaw the publication of Brigitte Bardot's autobiography in 1995. His main rival as a publisher was Claude Durand.

In 1970, Fasquelle purchased Le Nouveau Magazine Littéraire, which was sold in the 2000s to Groupe Artémis. From 1985 to 1997, he owned the chess magazine Europe Échecs. After his departure from Grasset, he became honorary president of the publishing house. In 2000, he contributed to Les Hussards. He served on the judicial boards for the Prix Méditerranée and the Prix Jean Freustié. He was also Vice-President of the Société littéraire des amis d'Émile Zola.

Fasquelle was married to Solange de La Rochefoucauld, who divorced him in 2000 and died in August 2016. The couple had one daughter, Ariane, who died in April 2016. His second wife, Nicky Jegher Fasquelle, died on 13 April 2020. She directed Le Nouveau Magazine Littéraire for more than 35 years.

Jean-Claude Fasquelle died in Paris on 13 March 2021 at the age of 90.

References

1930 births
2021 deaths
French publishers (people)
French businesspeople